Satish Kaul (born 6 February 1985) is an Austrian cricketer. He played for Austria in the 2011 ICC European T20 Championship Division One tournament.

References

1985 births
Living people
Austrian cricketers
Cricketers from Jalandhar